Three Days in August is a 2016 American drama directed by Johnathan Brownlee. The film is based on a true story written by Chad Berry and David Langlinais. The screenplay was written by Berry, Brownlee and Langlinais.

Synopsis 
The story centers on an adopted Irish-American artist's search for her birth mother, and the family dynamics when she secretly invites both sets of parents for a surprise reunion so she can paint a family portrait.

The film is inspired by the true story of Texas painter Shannon Kincaid, an adopted Irish-American artist who was given away at birth by a 16-year-old mother.

Cast 
 Luis Albert Acevedo Jr. as Father Granado (as Luis Acevado)
 Cal Bartlett as Francis
 Barry Bostwick as John
 Meg Foster as Maggie
 Mariette Hartley as Maureen
 Edward James Hyland as Aiden
 Mollie Milligan as Maggie
 Stephen Snedden as Sam
 Colton Tapp as Liam

Development 
The screenplay for Three Days in August was the winning entry in a screenwriting competition sponsored by the Dallas Film Society in 2015. The competition, entitled The Sionna Project, drew 200 submissions from 26 countries.

Three Days in August was announced in Variety in October 2015, with Barry Bostwick, Mariette Hartley, Ed Hyland, Mollie Milligan, Meg Foster, Cal Bartlett and Colton Tapp attached to star and Johnathan Brownlee to direct and produce.

Location 
Filming took place in October 2015 in Mineral Wells, Texas.

Release 
Three Days in August premiered at the Dallas International Film Festival in April 2016 and had its international premiere at the Montreal World Film Festival in August 2016. The film had a limited national theatrical release through the Dallas-based Studio Movie Grill chain in December 2016.

References

External links

2016 films
American drama films
2010s English-language films
2010s American films